Cherry is a 2010 American comedy film directed by Jeffrey Fine and starring Kyle Gallner and Laura Allen. It was released on SXSW 2010.

Plot 

Aaron, a college student with a passion for art, is majoring in engineering because his Mom insists. He falls in love with Linda, a classmate, a much older woman with a teenage daughter and a boyfriend, who she is not very interested in. While Linda is more interested in a friendship than a relationship, Beth, the 14 year old daughter, develops feelings for Aaron and confesses her unrequited love. Darcy, a woman who lives down the hall, also has some interest in Aaron, but that friendship is equally rocky.

Cast
 Kyle Gallner - Aaron
 Laura Allen - Linda
 Britt Robertson - Beth
 Matt Walsh - Prof. Van Auken
 Esai Morales - Wes
 D.C. Pierson - Wild Bill
 Zosia Mamet - Darcy

Reception 
On Rotten Tomatoes, the film holds an approval rating of 64% based on 11 reviews. 
Kimberley Jones, in her review for the Austin Chronicle said that "Despite some tonal inconsistencies and ill-fitting stabs at whimsy, all-around good performances, Fine's snappy script, and Michael Hoskins' original illustrations elevate Cherry into a sensitively felt and fundamentally sweet coming-of-age pic."

References

External links 

 

2010 comedy films
2010 films
American comedy films
American coming-of-age films
2010s English-language films
Films about teenagers
Films set in universities and colleges
2010s American films